Miro Steržaj (full name Miroslav Steržaj,  28 February 1933 – 8 November 2020) was a Slovene 9 pin bowling player and businessman.

Biography
He was born in Rakek, Municipality of Cerknica, but moved to Ljutomer when he was 17 years old. 

From 1950 to 1962 he played for KK Ljutomer, where he won his first Slovenian championship in 1960. In 1962 he moved to KK Branik in Maribor. In 1964 he became absolute European champion, winning in the individual, doubles and team events, while setting a new world record. In 1968 he became World champion in the individual category, adding to what would eventually become 4 World championship titles (3 with team in 1957, 1959 and 1976). He came second in doubles in 1968 (with Jože Turk), 1974 and 1976 (with Nikola Dragaš). He was part of the Yugoslav national team for 30 years, becoming their most capped player with 134 caps, which is a record for Slovenian players that stands until today. He won a record 7 individual national Yugoslavian titles (tied with Nikola Dragaš), a record 13 individual national Slovenian titles and a record 10 Slovenian national doubles titles.

In 1955 he began to work at Mlekopromet, a cheese producing dairy in Ljutomer. He was sales manager for 12 years, after which he was appointed director. In 1993 he retired from his post. After his retirement he became secretary of the Economic association of milk production (GIZ mlekarstva). In 2003 he retired from the association and work completely. For his success in buisiness, he received the award of Chamber of Commerce and Industry of Slovenia in 1981.

He served three terms as vice-mayor, and from 1988 to 1992 he was mayor of Ljutomer. He was part of the 1st Slovenian National Council.

He was named honorary citizen of Ljutomer in 2003. He received the Bloudek award for his sport achievements in 1968. Despite never being named Slovenian Sportsman of the Year outright, he got honoured as Slovenian Sportsman of the decade 1968–1978, awarded for the decade following the first Sportsman of the Year award ceremony. In 2012 he was inducted into the Slovenian Athletes Hall of Fame.

References 

 
 
 
 Slovenski veliki leksikon, Mladinska knjiga (2003)

1933 births
2020 deaths
People from the Municipality of Cerknica
Slovenian nine-pin bowling players
Mayors of places in Slovenia
People from Ljutomer
Slovenian sportsperson-politicians